The Ahinski Manor is an early XIX century country house located in the village of Zaliessie (also Zalesse), Smarhon district in Belarus.

Early years of the estate 
The estate was originally acquired by the Ahinski (Oginski) family in the early XVIII century. At that time it included a wooden palace, farmyard, pond, mill and a brewery. It had passed through several generations until the early ХІХ century when it was bequeathed to Michał Kleofas Ogiński.

Under ownership of Michał Kleofas Ogiński 
Michał Kleofas Ogiński who had been in exile since the defeat of the Kastsiushka uprising returned to the Russian Empire in 1802, following an amnesty by the Tzar. He settled in the Zaliessie estate and began construction of a new stone manor house in a classicist style by architect .

The works completed by 1815 and included a park in the style of Romanticism with trails and bridges across the local river.

Under the ownership of Ogiński the manor became a venue for musical concerts and literary events and was described as ‘Northern Athens” by contemporaries. In Zaliessie, Michał Kleofas Ogiński created many of his works, including the famous polonaise in A minor "”.

After Michał Kleofas Ogiński   
After the death of Michał Kleofas Ogiński, the estate was owned by several generations of his descendants. It fell on hard times in 1924 and was broken up and sold outside the family.

In Soviet Belarus the estate was used as a holiday resort and a nursing home.

At the beginning of the ХХІ century the manor was in a poor state, however between 2011-2015 large scale restoration works were undertaken. 

A museum dedicated to the life and work of Michał Kleofas Ogiński was opened on the premises after completion of the restoration.

Gallery

References 

 
 
Ogiński family